The Siloscinae are a subfamily of moth of the family Tineidae. The subfamily was described by Hungarian entomologist László Anthony Gozmány in 1968.

Most species of this subfamily are found in the Afrotropical region, but one species was described from China.

Genera
 Autochthonus Walsingham, 1891
 Organodesma Gozmány, 1965
 Silosca Gozmány, 1965

References
Gozmány L. A., 1965. Some collections of Tineid moths from Africa (Microlepidoptera). — Acta Zoologica Academiae Scientiarum Hungaricae 11(): 253–294.